The Communist Party (Marxist–Leninist) of San Marino (in Italian: Partito Comunista (Marxista-Leninista) di San Marino) was an anti-revisionist, Maoist, communist party in San Marino. The party was founded in 1968 by the Marxist–Leninist Movement of San Marino (Movimento Marxista–Leninista di San Marino), which had been formed a few years earlier by dissidents of the San Marinese Communist Party.

The party participated in the parliamentary elections in 1969 (obtaining 1.24% of the votes) and in 1974 (121 votes, 0.8%). The party failed to win any seats.

References

Political parties established in 1968
Defunct political parties in San Marino
Communist parties in San Marino
Maoist organizations in Europe
1968 establishments in San Marino
Defunct communist parties